The Caddo River is a tributary of the Ouachita River in the U.S. state of Arkansas.

Course
The Caddo River flows out of the Ouachita Mountains through Montgomery, Pike, and Clark counties in Arkansas before flowing into DeGray Lake and then to its terminus at the Ouachita River north of Arkadelphia, Arkansas.

The upper Caddo is known as a good family canoeing river and is a popular destination for fishing.  Smallmouth and spotted bass are found in quantity, as are longear and green sunfish.  The lower course of the Caddo, below Degray Dam, is also a popular fishing and canoeing river, although the length of river remaining is only a few miles at that point.

Communities through which the Caddo River passes are:
Black Springs, Arkansas
Norman, Arkansas
Caddo Gap, Arkansas
Glenwood, Arkansas
Amity, Arkansas
Caddo Valley, Arkansas
Arkadelphia, Arkansas

Flood of 2010
On the night of June 11, 2010, a flash flood along the Caddo and Little Missouri Rivers killed twenty people.

Etymology
The Caddo River is named for the Caddo Native American tribes that, at one time, lived along its banks.

See also
 List of rivers of Arkansas

References

External links
Caddo River and DeGray Lake

Rivers of Arkansas
Tributaries of the Red River of the South
Ouachita Mountains
Arkansas placenames of Native American origin
Rivers of Clark County, Arkansas
Rivers of Montgomery County, Arkansas
Rivers of Pike County, Arkansas
Rivers of Hot Spring County, Arkansas
Ouachita River